Hermann Gretener (8 September 1942 – 27 March 2022) was a Swiss professional cyclo-cross cyclist. He notably won the Swiss National Cyclo-cross Championships six times: in 1966, 1969, 1971, 1972, 1973 and 1975 in addition to four more podium finishes. He also won a silver medal at the UCI World Championships in 1966 and 1968 and a bronze medal in 1967 and 1972.

References

External links

1942 births
2022 deaths
Swiss male cyclists
Cyclo-cross cyclists
Sportspeople from the canton of Zürich